Executive Stress is a British sitcom that aired on ITV from 1986 to 1988. Produced by Thames Television, it first aired on 20 October 1986. After three series, the last episode aired on 27 December 1988.

Written by George Layton, Executive Stress stars Penelope Keith as Caroline Fairchild, a middle-aged woman who decides to go back to work. Her husband, Donald, is played by Geoffrey Palmer in the first series. However, Palmer was unable to return for the second series, so Peter Bowles played Donald in the remaining two series. Keith and Bowles had previously appeared together in the BBC comedy series, To the Manor Born.

Production
The programme was set in the world of publishing as it was one of the few industries of the era dominated by women, meaning Donald and Caroline could realistically be on an equal footing at work. Producer John Howard Davies, commissioned a second series before the first series had even aired. 

The opening theme, "Why We Fell in Love," was performed by Julie Covington. The lyrics were written by Sir Tim Rice with the instrumentals composed by Andrew Lloyd Webber.

Cast
Penelope Keith – Caroline Fairchild (née Fielding)
Geoffrey Palmer – Donald Fairchild (series 1)
Peter Bowles – Donald Fairchild (series 2 and 3)
Harry Ditson – Edgar Frankland Jr
Elizabeth Counsell – Anthea Duxbury
Mark Caven – Anthony
Hilary Gish – Nicky
Richard Marner – Herman Ginsberg (series 1)
Timothy Carlton – Peter Stuart (series 1)
David Neville – Peter Stuart (series 2)
Lorraine Doyle – Jackie (series 1 and 2)
Ben Robertson – Stephen Cass (series 1 and 2)
Wanda Ventham – Sylvia (series 2)
Donald Pickering – Gordon (series 2)
Vincent Brimble – Tim Jackson (series 3)
Geoffrey Whitehead – Peter Davenport (series 3)

Plot
After 25 years of marriage, mother-of-five Caroline Fairchild decides to go back to work. Her husband Donald would like her to work part-time in their home town of Amersham in Buckinghamshire. Instead she gets a job in London as an Editorial Director for a company called Oasis Publishing. At the company she is reunited with her former secretary, Anthea Duxbury, who is a sales export director.

Oasis Publishing is owned by the American Frankland Corporation, which is run by Edgar Frankland, Jr., the son of the corporation's boss. On Caroline's first day at work, The Frankland Corporation takes over Ginsberg Publishing, the company that Donald works for. Donald is moved to Oasis, and Caroline and he find themselves working together. However, an unwritten rule at Frankland states that married couples cannot work together, so they have to pretend not to know each other, so Caroline uses her maiden name of Fielding. In Series Two, Edgar finds out they are married, but does not sack them and makes them joint managing directors of Oasis.

Episodes
Three series of Executive Stress were broadcast from 1986 to 1988. The first series, made of seven episodes, aired on Mondays at 20:00 following Coronation Street, as did the six-episode second series. The third series, also of six episodes, aired on Tuesdays at 20.30 following The Bill.

Series 1: 1986

Series 2: 1987

Series 3: 1988

Broadcast around the world
In the United States, many PBS member stations aired at least the first series in the 1980s and 1990s.

Reruns of the series also aired in 2009 in Australia on ABC Television.

DVD release 
The complete first and second series of Executive Stress were released on 26 April 2010 and 24 January 2011, by Network, The third (and final) series was finally released on 20 May 2013, followed by a complete series set (consisting all three series) on 13 August 2018.

See also
 The Cara Williams Show, an American sitcom of 1964–1965 with a similar premise.

References

External links
 

1986 British television series debuts
1988 British television series endings
1980s British sitcoms
ITV sitcoms
Television series by Fremantle (company)
Television shows produced by Thames Television
English-language television shows
1980s British workplace comedy television series
Television shows shot at Teddington Studios